Saletara liberia is a butterfly of the family Pieridae. It is found in Indonesia, the Philippines, Peninsular Malaysia and various islands in the region. Subspecies S. l. distanti is known by the common name Malaysian albatross.

Subspecies
S. l. liberia (Ambon, Serang)
S. l. eliade (Moluccas)
S. l. panda (Java)
S. l. balina (Bali)
S. l. distanti (Peninsular Malaya, Singapore, Sumatra)
S. l. schoenbergi (Nias)
S. l. engania (Enggano)
S. l. aurifolia (Pulautelo, Batu Island)
S. l. chrysea (Nicobars)
S. l. nathalia (Luzon, Philippines)
S. l. martia (Basilan and Mindanao, Philippines)
S. l. erebina (Palawan, Philippines)
S. l. hostilia (Balabac, Philippines)
S. l. nigerrima (Sulawesi)
S. l. aurantiaca (Sula Island)
S. l. natunensis (Natuna Island)
S. l. dohertyi (Sumbawa)
S. l. obina (Obi)
S. l. chrysoberylla (Buru)

Pierini
Butterflies of Indochina
Butterflies of Indonesia
Taxa named by Pieter Cramer
Butterflies described in 1779